Douglas MacArthur High School (commonly MacArthur or Mac) is a public secondary school on the northeast side of San Antonio, Texas, United States.  The school, a part of the North East Independent School District serves students in ninth grade through twelfth grade, with admission based primarily on the locations of students' homes. The school serves portions of San Antonio and the portion of Terrell Hills within NEISD.

History
MacArthur High School was the first high school in the North East Independent School District.  It was established in 1950 as North East Rural High School, but was later renamed after Douglas MacArthur in the 1958–1959 school year after the opening of Robert E. Lee High School.

The campus was composed of separate academic buildings spread out over 37.8 acres until 1999 when the school underwent major construction.  All buildings were demolished, except for the auditorium, cafeteria, and fine arts building, which were renovated.  A new gymnasium was constructed, as well as a new main building, consisting of four wings, each three floors tall, with an open air courtyard in the center.  The combining of the academic buildings allowed for the addition of several new athletic fields. The Track at the school was renovated in the summer of 2008. Additional construction began in 2016 to construct a new Science and Athletics building. In 2018, the Fine Arts building began renovations and expansion.

The school's athletic and other organizations have seen many successes with district, regional, and state appearances and championships. The school has achieved notable recognition in recent years for its UIL Academic teams, with both teams and individuals placing at the state level in science, current events, and social studies competitions, and a 2007 TMSCA State Championship in science. On a national level, MacArthur physics students have placed consistently in the top 15 in the JETS TEAMS Engineering Competition. The school was recognized as a National Blue Ribbon School in 1988–1989.

MacArthur letter
General Douglas MacArthur sent a letter to the school in January 1964 after a birthday celebration in his honor.  The letter is located on the first floor in the administration department.

Extracurricular activities
MacArthur hosted the first Texas French Symposium in 1964, and subsequently in 1965, 1966, 1970, 1971, 1974 and 1995.

Since its establishment in 1968, the MacArthur Blue Guard (MBG) varsity level armed drill team has continually represented MacArthur's Army Junior Reserve Officers Training Corps (J.R.O.T.C.). Battalion and MacArthur High School with military excellence and precision in U.S. Army platoon drill and exhibition.  Since the mid-1980's, MBG has achieved best in State status, to include best armed drill team in the nation at the drill team championships in Daytona Beach, FL in 1990.  In addition to the Blue Guard, MacArthur High School's varsity Color Guard is made up of 4 members (U.S. Flag, Texas Flag, U.S. Flag Guard and Texas Flag Guard) of the MBG and would present those colors at all home football games as well as compete in competition around the state.

MacArthur's football team has made one appearance in the UIL State 5A Championship game in 1998.  MacArthur had lost on December 12 to Katy High School 14–6.  However, Katy's win was forfeited for using an ineligible student during the regular season.  Given hours to prepare, MacArthur played in the state title game but lost to Midland Lee 54–0.

MacArthur's baseball team reached the state finals in 1966 in Class 4A, the largest classification at the time. It lost to the Freeport Brazosport Exporters, 6–1. And again in 1987, the baseball team reached the state finals in the UIL Class 5A category, losing to Abilene Cooper, 13–3.

The Boys Cross Country team placed second behind Churchill in the district cross country meet on November 1, 2008. One runner from MacArthur placed third in the individual division at the District meet. The team finished in 14th place in the Region IV-Meet. Also one female runner the cross- country team qualified in the top 10 individual division to qualify for the Region IV meet on November 1, 2008.

MacArthur High School also has a very active fine arts program with one of the highlights being the Marching Band known as "the Big Blue Marching Machine".  The MacArthur marching band has stood for excellence for over 37 years now.  The band has a 27-year record of Superior UIL Sweepstake Awards in marching, concert and sight-reading.  The band has been winners of major music contests in Texas, Florida, and California.  The band won two State Marching Band Championships in Class 5A, one in 1985, and the other in 1986. In addition, the theater department at MacArthur High School has been outstanding for many years, and won the UIL One Act Theater competition for many years, under the leadership of Charles Jeffries, Luis Munoz, Jerry Knight, and Molly Risso.  In 2014, the MacArthur OAP was the only school in NEISD to compete in the State UIL competition, finishing 4th in the State.  MacArthur Theater was under the direction of Dean Whitus and Casey O'Bryant.  In 2015, under the direction of Dean Whitus and Margaret Tonra, MacArthur was the only NEISD school to make it into the Area competition, and finished in 3rd place and alternate for State competition.

In 2007, the Brahmadoras varsity dance team WON nationals in the kick category at NDA nationals in orlando Florida

In 2009, the Varsity Cheerleaders won the Universal Cheerleaders Association National Championship in the Small Varsity category.

In 2010, the Varsity Football Team won the title of District Champions.

In March 2015, the Lassies Junior Varsity dance team won the nationals in the Pom category at NDA Nationals in Orlando, Florida.

In 2015, the MacArthur Winter Guard won 1st place in Scholastic A Class at the TCGC Championships in College Station, Texas. Throughout the season, they have won first place at every competition. Their show was entitled "Lose Yourself".

TAP
MacArthur High School houses the Electrical Systems Technology Program for students interested in the electrical industry.  The program has been established as a Technical Apprenticeship Program (TAP) in conjunction with the United States Department of Labor, Bureau of Apprenticeship and Training.  Students have the opportunity to earn apprenticeship hours while they are in high school. They Learn Residential, Commercial, and Industrial Motor Control Wiring, as Well as State Local and National Electrical Codes, and many continue to work for many of the local electrical contractors such as Five Point Electric, Calcote Electric and many others.

Notable alumni

Athletics
 Jace Amaro (Class of 2010) – Current NFL player (tight end) for the Kansas City Chiefs
 David Bailiff (Class of 1976) – College football coach who was most recently the head coach at Rice University from 2007 to 2017.
 Keith Edmonson (Class of 1978) – NBA player (point guard)
 John Gibbons (Class of 1980) – Former MLB professional baseball player and is the current manager of the Toronto Blue Jays
 Jerry Grote (Class of 1961) – Former MLB professional baseball player And World Series catcher with the New York Mets
 Josh Jung (Class of 2016) – Active MLB third baseman for the Texas Rangers
 Jason Szuminski (Class of 1997) – Former MLB professional baseball player

Government
 Dan Branch (Class of 1976) – Former member of the Texas House of Representatives, and current Dallas attorney.
 Robert T. Clark (Class of 1966) – Retired United States Army Lieutenant General
 Lyle Larson (Class of 1977) – Member of the Texas House of Representatives, from District 122

Art & Film
 David Crabb (Class of 1994) – Storyteller, actor, and author
 Terri Hendrix (Class of 1986) – singer-songwriter, independent record label owner, activist
 Terra Jolé (Class of 1998) – Reality TV star
 Joseph King (Class of 1994) – Singer for the band Deadbeat Darling
 Kirk Lynn (Class of 1990) – Playwright
 Bruce McGill (Class of 1968) – Actor
 Don Mischer (Class of 1958) – Television producer
 Norah O'Donnell (Class of 1991) – co-anchor for CBS This Morning.
 Deborah Paredez (Class of 1989) – Poet and academic
 Robert Wright (Class of 1975) – Author of The Moral Animal, Nonzero, The Evolution of God, and others

Business
 John Lilly (Class of 1989) – Venture capitalist and former CEO of the Mozilla Corporation from 2008 to 2010

References

External links
Official website
Alma mater & school fight song

North East Independent School District high schools
Educational institutions established in 1950
High schools in San Antonio
Public high schools in Texas
1950 establishments in Texas